"Diggin' in the Dirt" is a song by Swiss recording artist Stefanie Heinzmann. The song was written by Martin Fliegenschmidt, Claudio Pagonis, Matthias Hass, Herbie Crichlow while the production was done by Fliegenschmidt, Pagonis and Kiko Masbaum. The song was released as the first single from her third self-titled album, Stefanie Heinzmann. This song is a PAL Region exclusive for Just Dance 4, but playable in NTSC from the Just Dance Unlimited and Just Dance+ services.

Chart performance
In Switzerland, "Diggin' in the Dirt" debuted at number seven on the Swiss Singles Chart, for the issue dated 4 March 2012, as well as becoming Heinzmann's first top ten single for Stefanie Heinzmann era. In second week, the single dropped to #16, after one week at #7. In its third week, the single went up to #6. In fourth week, the single dropped to #10. In its fifth week it went up to #6 on the Swiss Charts.

Track listings
Digital download
 "Diggin' in the Dirt" – 3:33
 "Old Flame" – 3:46
 "Diggin' in the Dirt" (Music video) - 3:39
CD single
 "Diggin' in the Dirt" – 3:33
 "Old Flame" – 3:46

Charts and certifications

Weekly charts

Year-end charts

Certifications

References

2012 singles
Songs written by Herbie Crichlow
Songs written by Martin Fliegenschmidt
Songs written by Claudio Pagonis
2012 songs
Universal Music Group singles